Standby...Lights! Camera! Action! was an American educational television series hosted by Leonard Nimoy. The program aired on Nickelodeon from October 1982 to December 31, 1987. Episodes of the show included interviews with film crew members and examined the stages of production for various motion pictures in a behind-the-scenes format.

Format
Episodes of the series opened with host Leonard Nimoy at the Nickelodeon studio, introducing himself and announcing the episode's focus (such as performing stunts, special effects or animation). Nimoy would then leave the Nickelodeon studio to visit a filming location, where he described how different motion pictures incorporated the episode's topic. He typically examined three upcoming films in each one-hour segment before returning to the Nickelodeon studio and signing off.

History
Nickelodeon executive Cy Schneider green-lit the series in 1981 in an aim to add variety to Nickelodeon's schedule, which at the time only consisted of five looped programs. Nickelodeon initially ordered a twelve-episode first season, later increased to twenty. In a 1984 interview with The New York Times, Warner-Amex president John A. Schneider stated that having Nimoy host the series was part of a strategy to "seduce kids into watching" using popular actors. When asked why he chose to host the program despite having more profitable opportunities, Nimoy explained that he supported the network.

TV Guides panel of educators and executives recommended the series, citing it as an "excellent offering" on cable, in February 1986.

As with other such classic Nickelodeon programming as You Can't Do That on Television, it holds the unique distinction of being aired on the network during both its "Silver Ball" and "Orange" eras.

Episodes

References

External links 
 

American children's education television series
English-language television shows
American motion picture television series
Science education television series
1980s Nickelodeon original programming
1980s American children's television series
1980s American documentary television series
1982 American television series debuts
1987 American television series endings